Hot desking (sometimes called "non-reservation-based hoteling") is an office organization system that involves multiple workers using a single physical work station or surface during different time periods. The "desk" in the name refers to a table or other work space being shared by multiple workers on different shifts as opposed to every staff member having their own personal desk. A primary motivation for hot-desking is cost reduction through space savings—up to 30% in some cases. Hot desking is especially valuable in cities where real estate prices are high.

Usage
Hot desking is often found in workplaces with flexible schedules for employees, where not all employees are actually working in an office at the same time. Employees in such workplaces use existing offices only occasionally or for short periods, which leaves offices vacant part of the time. By sharing offices, employees make more efficient use of space and resources. However, hot desking comes with disadvantages, including a lack of permanent space, an unclear work hierarchy, and possibly inconvenient communication between members of a team. For some employees, hot-desking may be hard to get used to, as people have different ways of using a desk (adjusting the chair height, moving around decorations, keeping the space tidy).

An alternative version of hot desking is possible where employees have multiple tasks and multiple employees may require a certain work station, but not for their entire range of duties. Thus a permanent work station can be made available to any worker as and when needed (also known as a "touchdown" space), with employees sharing it. This could be for a single element of one’s work, for example, when a sales employee needs an office for a client meeting, but does not otherwise need a personal office. Another example is when employees need to perform specific tasks at work stations created for those tasks in an assembly line fashion. There, the individual work stations are not set up as personal office space. A collection of such workstations is sometimes called a mobility centre.

With the growth of mobility services, hot desking can also include the routing of voice and other messaging services to any location where the user is able to log into a corporate network. Therefore, their telephone number, their email, and instant messaging can be routed to their location on the network and no longer to just their physical desk.

The COVID-19 pandemic resulted in remote work becoming more common, with many employees only coming into the office for part of the week. This increased reliance on hot desking, to avoid paying for unused desk space.

Origin
The term "hot desking" is thought to derive from the naval practice of hot racking, where sailors on different shifts share the same bunks.

References 

Desks
Working conditions
Office administration